Lanjigarh Road Junction railway station is a railway station on the East Coast Railway network in the state of Odisha, India. It serves Lanjigarh town. Its code is LJR. It has four platforms. Passenger, Express trains halt at Lanjigarh Road Junction railway station.

Major trains

 Sambalpur–Rayagada Intercity Express
 Tapaswini Express
 Bhubaneswar–Junagarh Express

Passenger Trains

 Junagarh Road-Sambalpur Special Express
 Junagarh Road-Raipur Junction Special Express

See also
 Kalahandi district

References

Railway stations in Kalhandi district
Sambalpur railway division